Crawford Bay Airport, formerly , was located  south of Crawford Bay, British Columbia, Canada, on the east side of Kootenay Lake.

References

External links
Page about this airport on COPA's Places to Fly airport directory

Defunct airports in British Columbia
West Kootenay